HMS Battler (D18) was an American-built escort carrier that served with the Royal Navy during the Second World War.

Battlers first duty was as a convoy escort in the Battle of the Atlantic. The ship was active in the Mediterranean, Indian Ocean, and later, the war in the Pacific. She served as a convoy escort, aircraft ferry, and anti-submarine escort during the war.

Construction
She was laid down on 15 April 1941, as a C3-S-A1, the third replacement for the freighter Mormacmail, for Moore-McCormack Lines, Inc., under Maritime Commission contract at Pascagoula, Mississippi, by Ingalls Shipbuilding, MC Hull 160. On 17 March 1942, her name was cancelled and she was assigned to be transferred to the Royal Navy under Lend-Lease. She was launched on 4 April 1942; sponsored by Mrs. Marguerite M. Seymour, the wife of Captain Phillip Seymour, USN. She was redesignated ACV on 20 August 1942. Acquired by the United States Navy on 31 October 1942, she was immediately transferred to the United Kingdom on the same day.

Design and description
There were eleven Attacker-class in service with the Royal Navy during the Second World War. They were built between 1941 and 1942, by Seattle-Tacoma Shipbuilding Corporation, Ingalls Shipbuilding, and Western Pipe & Steel shipyards in the United States.

The ship had complement of 646 men, who lived in crew accommodation that was significantly different from the arrangements that were normal for the Royal Navy at the time. The separate messes no longer had to prepare their own food, as everything was cooked in the galley and served cafeteria style in a central dining area. They were also equipped with a modern laundry and a barber shop. The traditional hammocks were replaced by three-tier bunk-beds, 18 to a cabin, which were hinged and could be tied up to provide extra space when not in use.

She displaced  at full load.

She had the operating capacity for up to 24 aircraft, which could be a mixture of anti-submarine and fighter aircraft; the British Hawker Sea Hurricane and Supermarine Seafire naval fighters, Fairey Swordfish torpedo bomber or the American-supplied Grumman Martlet and Vought F4U Corsair fighters or Grumman Avenger torpedo bomber could be carried. The exact composition of the embarked squadrons depended upon the mission. Some squadrons were composite squadrons for convoy defence and would be equipped with both anti-submarine and fighter aircraft, while other squadrons working in a strike carrier role would only be equipped with fighter aircraft. Aircraft facilities were a small combined bridge–flight control on the starboard side and above the  flight deck, two aircraft lifts , and nine arrestor wires. Aircraft could be housed in the  hangar below the flight deck. When employed as an aircraft transport she could carry 90 aircraft.

The ships armament concentrated on anti-aircraft (AA) defence and consisted of eight  Bofors guns in twin mounts and ten  Oerlikon cannons in single and eight in twin mounts. In addition, she had two /50 caliber Mk 9 guns for surface action.

Battler was designed to accompany other ships forming the escort for convoys. The anti-submarine aircraft employed were initially the Fairey Swordfish and later the Grumman Avenger, which could be armed with torpedoes, depth charges,  bombs or RP-3 rocket projectiles. As well as carrying out their own attacks on U-Boats, these aircraft identified their locations for the convoy's escorts to mount an attack. Typically anti-submarine patrols would be flown between dawn and dusk. One aircraft would fly about  ahead of the convoy, while another patrolled astern. Patrols would last between two and three hours, using both radar and visual observation in their search for U-Boats.
Battler also had a secondary role, providing oil and provisions for her accompanying destroyers. This could be a lengthy process and was done on the move. It took 40 minutes from firing a line across to the destroyer to start pumping oil, while it took another two hours to pump 98 tons of oil and a further 35 minutes to disconnect the hose pipe and secure the equipment.

Service history
Battler began her sea trials in early November 1942, but had to put in at New Orleans, 9 November, for repairs after striking a jetty. With repairs finished by 15 November, she returned to trials until 23 November, when she arrived at Norfolk Navy Yard, in Virginia. Here defects found during her trials were rectified and modification work carried out.

Beginning 8 December 1942, Battler embarked the Naval Air Squadrons 890, 892, and 894 consisting of six Martlet IVs each. On 11 December, she sailed for the east coast of Florida, to embark six Swordfish of 840 squadron on 12 December. Battler arrived in New York City, on 18 December, and proceeded to Todd Erie Basin Dry Docks, Inc. to clean out her fuel tanks.

On 21 December 1942, Battler sailed for Liverpool, with Convoy HX 220. On 26 December, 840 squadron disembarked for NAS Quonset Point, for further work-up. After a stormy crossing Battler arrived on the Clyde on 8 January 1943, where 890, 892 and 894 squadrons disembarked to RNAS Machrihanish, then she proceeded to Harland and Wolff, for refit to Royal Navy standards, arriving 12 January.

After completing her refit, Battler sailed for Greenock, on 4 April, for trials. The ship's air group was brought on board on 10 April 1943, and consisted of six Swordfish II biplanes, former torpedo planes given a new lease on life as an antisubmarine aircraft, of the Fleet Air Arm's 835 squadron and nine Seafires of 808 squadron.

Battler embarked 20 Seafires and 2 Hurricane IICs at RNAMY Belfast, on 23 May, for ferrying to Gibraltar. Departing Belfast, Northern Ireland, on 4 June 1943, she took on five Swordfish from 835 squadron, on 5 June, along with four Seafires from 808 squadron from RNAS Yeovilton, the next day. Throughout the voyage, her aircraft conducted antisubmarine patrols, reaching Gibraltar, on 14 June. She returned to the British Isles eight days later, as part of the escort for Convoy KMS 16 and XK 9. Battler launched two Seafires at 2230 on 24 June, to deal with a four engined Focke Wulf FW 200 "Condor" which was shadowing the convoy. Within 12 minutes, the pilots reported triumphantly that the "Condor" had been shot down. Reaching Greenock, on 28 June, Battler had proved herself efficient on her maiden convoy escort venture.

Mediterranean

Operation Avalanche
She was to provide air cover for Operation Avalanche, the invasion of Salerno, Italy.

Battler arrived at Malta, 5 September, and sailed for Salerno, on 8 September. The carriers were to provide air cover during the landings, with up to 20 aircraft in flight at a time. It had been planned that at least one of the enemy airfields would be taken on the first day of the invasion, but it took until the third day for this to happen. Since the escort carriers were designed for anti-submarine warfare (A/S), none of them were equipped for fighter direction, this was provided by the Fighter Direction Ship .

On 12 September, the task force withdrew to Palermo, Sicily, for replenishment, returning 16 September. On 20 September, Attacker, Hunter, and Stalker returned to the United Kingdom for refit and replacement aircraft, while Battler proceeded to Gibraltar. She was assigned to the Eastern Fleet for duty protecting Bombay to Aden convoys.

Indian Ocean

On 28 September, she arrived in Port Said, and after passing through the Suez Canal, sailed for Aden, arriving 4 October 1943.

She arrived on 26 October, and left 4 November, along with Quiberon and Quality to rendezvous with the LST Convoy AB 18A for escort to Bombay. She provided A/S cover from 7 to 9 November. On 11 November, Battler, Rotherham, and  left Bombay to rendezvous with Convoy AB 20 for escort to Bombay. She again provided A/S coverage from 14 to 17 November.

Battler and part of the convoy, after having split into three sections, arrived in Bombay, on 19 December.

Operations Thwart and Covered
The purpose of the operation was to search for the blockade runner, U-boat supply ship Charlotte Schliemann, southeast of Mauritius. With the main force sailing from Colombo on 12 January, Battler joined them at Mauritius on 16 January. The force searched from 19 to 21 January, then a smaller force, named Force 64, consisting of Battler, Kenya, and Nepal, searching from 23 to 30 January, further southeast of Mauritius. The operation was called off on 30 January, after adverse weather set in and fruitless searching turned up nothing.

On 4 February, Battler and Suffolk arrived at Durban, South Africa. She returned to Mauritius, in early March, to search for another blockade runner, the U-boat supply ship Brake, during Operation Covered. Battler launched Swordfish armed with rockets to shadow Brake in an attempt not to alert the tanker to the carriers presence, while Roebuck moved in for an attack. At noon, Roebuck commenced her attack on Brake forcing her crew to scuttle her, while the Swordfish damaged one of the U-boats. On 16 March, the group arrived in Mauritius, with Battler proceeding to Durban, for refit, arriving 21 March 1944.

Convoy and A/S duty
Embarking only the Swordfish of 834 squadron on 24 June 1944, after completion of her refit, Battler sailed north with Convoy CM 55, from Durban to Kilindini, on 28 June. She escorted Convoy KR 11 from Kilindini to Colombo, on 11 July, arriving on 22 July. She disembarked 834 squadron at RNAS Katukurunda on 25 July, where six Wildcat Vs were waiting to replace the Seafires that had been left at Durban.

On August 11, 1944, 834 squadron embarked on Battler and carried out A/S patrols near Colombo. On 22 August, she set off for Addu Atoll, in the Maldive Islands, to carry out more A/S patrols. On 19 September, 834 squadron disembarked at RNAS Coimbatore, for replacement aircraft, returning to Battler on 28 September. On 7 October, Battler disembarked 834 squadron at Trincomalee. During her time at Trincomalee, 849 squadrons Avengers performed Deck Landing Training.

Ferry duty
Battler was redesignated as a "Ferry Carrier" at the beginning of November. On 7 November 1944, she embarked 834 squadron to be ferried back to the UK. With her orders changed, Battler unloaded 834 squadron while Thane unloaded the Avenger and Hellcraft aircraft that were to be embarked in Battler for transport to Sydney, Australia. She would still return to the UK, but it would be via Australia and the Panama Canal.

On 11 December, most of the destroyers broke from the convoy and returned to Trincomalee, while Swiftsure and Achilles departed on 16 December, to continue ahead for Fremantle.

After unloading her aircraft in Sydney, Battler loaded stores and equipment bound for the UK. She arrived in Bilbao, on 1 February 1945, and Norfolk, Virginia, on 3 February. Embarking aircraft at Naval Station Norfolk, she sailed for New York on 13 February, to join Convoy CU 59. CU 59 departed New York, on 19 February, and arrived on 1 March, at Liverpool.

North Atlantic

Deck landing training
On 5 March 1945, Battler was allocated to Western Approaches Command for use as a Deck Landing Training carrier. For her new role Battler received modification in Belfast. On 5 May 1945, she began practice with 768 squadron in the Firth of Clyde. On 4 June, she was allocated to Rosyth Command in the same role, but shifting to the Firth of Forth with 768 squadron. In October, she began training 731 and 767 squadrons until 8 January 1946, when she was sent to Greenock, for decommissioning.

Decommissioning
On 19 January, Battler sailed from the Clyde, for Norfolk, Virginia, arriving 31 January. She was decommissioned at Norfolk, on 12 February, and returned to USN custody. Deemed "not essential to the defense of the United States", on 6 March, she was struck from the Naval Vessel Register on 28 March. She was sold on 14 May, to the Patapsco Steel Scrap Co., Bethlehem, Pennsylvania, and delivered on 12 June 1946, and was subsequently scrapped.

FAA squadrons

References

Bibliography

External links

  Complete set of photos + 'HMS Battler Diary of Flying Operations' logged
 
 

Type C3-S-A1 ships of the Royal Navy
Bogue-class escort carriers
Attacker-class escort carriers
Ships built in Pascagoula, Mississippi
1942 ships
World War II aircraft carriers of the United Kingdom